Leslee may refer to

Leslee Feldman, studio head of casting
Leslee Silverman, Canadian theater director
Leslee Smith, British Virgin Islands basketball player
Leslee Udwin, British filmmaker
Leslee Unruh, Activist
Leslee Milam Post, American politician